Saint Euphrosynus of Pskov (c. 1386 – May 15, 1481) was a Russian monk and founder of a monastic community.

Euphrosynus was born as Eleazar in Videlebe, a village near Pskov. He entered the Snetogorsky monastery in Pskov, where he took the monastic name Euphrosynus. Around 1425 he began living in a hermitage, where he reported religious visions, and began attracting followers. Gradually, novices began to gather around him, the monastic community of the future began to take shape Yelizarov Convent. In 1477, he built a church and instituted a monastic rule for the community, setting up his follower Ignatius as hegumenos. He died a few years later, in 1481.

References

1386 births
1481 deaths
15th-century Christian saints
People from Pskov
Russian saints
Russian saints of the Eastern Orthodox Church
Russian Orthodox monks
Miracle workers
15th-century Christian monks